Charles Brown Middleton (October 3, 1874 – April 22, 1949) was an American stage and film actor. During a film career that began at age 46 and lasted almost 30 years, he appeared in nearly 200 films as well as numerous plays. Sometimes credited as Charles B. Middleton, he is perhaps best remembered for his role as the villainous emperor Ming the Merciless in the three Flash Gordon serials made between 1936 and 1940.

Career
Born in Elizabethtown, Kentucky, Middleton worked in a traveling circus, in vaudeville, and acted in live theatre before he turned to motion pictures in 1920. Middleton's success as a character actor, however, did not become firmly established until the sound era in films. His ominous baritone voice proved ideal for villainous roles, and he became an ideal foil for comedy stars Harold Lloyd, Eddie Cantor, Wheeler & Woolsey, and Laurel and Hardy.

Middleton was cast in Warner Bros 1931 film Safe in Hell as well as in their 1932 hit The Strange Love of Molly Louvain opposite Ann Dvorak and Richard Cromwell. In Pack Up Your Troubles, he portrays a villainous welfare association officer, the foil of Laurel & Hardy. He is also the district attorney in Cecil B. DeMille's 1933 film This Day and Age; and he appears opposite The Marx Brothers in Duck Soup (also 1933), performing as the stern prosecutor of Freedonia. In Universal Pictures' classic 1936 screen version of the musical Show Boat, he is Sheriff Ike Vallon, the official who tries to arrest Julie La Verne (Helen Morgan) and her husband for being illegally married.

Since Middleton's facial features generally resembled those of Abraham Lincoln, he was cast to portray Lincoln in the 1933 public-service short The Road Is Open Again. Four years later, in an uncredited role in the comedy Stand-In, he appears as an actor dressed as Lincoln who complains of being typecast as the former president. Middleton's association with Lincoln did not end there, although in the 1940 feature film Abe Lincoln in Illinois, he performs not as Abe but as Thomas, Lincoln's father.

Middleton also has prominent roles in many serials from 1935 to 1947. He is especially well known for his characterization of Ming the Merciless, the evil adversary of the heroic outer-space adventurer Flash Gordon. He appears as Ming in three related serials: Flash Gordon (1936), Flash Gordon's Trip to Mars (1938), and Flash Gordon Conquers the Universe (1940). Some of the other serials in which Middleton can be seen include Dick Tracy Returns, Daredevils of the Red Circle, and Jack Armstrong. He also portrays the ranch foreman Buck Peters in the 1935 movie Hopalong Cassidy Enters, which is the first entry in that long-running Western series.

Death
Middleton died of a heart attack in Los Angeles just two months after the 1949 release of The Last Bandit, the last film in which he appeared. His grave site is located in Hollywood Forever Cemetery and is situated next to the grave of his wife of many years, stage and film actress Leora Spellman.

Partial filmography

 The $1,000,000 Reward (1920) as William Russell
 Wits vs. Wits (1920) as Frank Cheny
 The Evil Dead (1922) as William Russell
 Pirates of the Pines (1928)
 The Farmer's Daughter (1928) as Hiram Flint
 The Bellamy Trial (1929) as District Attorney
 The Far Call (1929) as Kris Larsen
 Welcome Danger (1929) as John Thorne
 Beau Bandit (1930) as Lucius J. Perkins
 Way Out West (1930) as Buck Rankin
 East Is West (1930) as Dr. Fredericks
 Ships of Hate (1931) as Captain Lash
 The Miracle Woman (1931) as Simpson
 An American Tragedy (1931) as Jephson
 Caught Plastered (1931) as Sheriff Flint
 Alexander Hamilton (1931) as Rabble Rousing Townsman (uncredited)
 Palmy Days (1931) as Yolando
 A Dangerous Affair (1931) as Tupper
 Sob Sister (1931) as City Editor Baker
 The Ruling Voice (1931) as Board Member (uncredited)
 A House Divided (1931) as Minister
 Safe in Hell (1931) as Lawyer Jones
 X Marks the Spot (1931) as Detective Kirby
 Manhattan Parade (1931) as Sheriff Casey (uncredited)
 Full of Notions (1931)
 Forbidden (1932) as Pianist (uncredited)
 High Pressure (1932) as Mr. Banks
 The Hatchet Man (1932) as Lip Hop Fat
 The Strange Love of Molly Louvain (1932) as Captain Slade
 Mystery Ranch (1932) as Henry Steele
 Pack Up Your Troubles (1932) as The Welfare Association Officer
 The Phantom President (1932) as Abe Lincoln (uncredited)
 Hell's Highway (1932) as Matthew the Hermit
 Breach of Promise (1932) as Joe Pugmire
 I Am a Fugitive from a Chain Gang (1932) as Train Conductor (uncredited)
 Rockabye (1932) as District Attorney (uncredited)
 The Sign of the Cross (1932) as Tyros
 Silver Dollar (1932) as Jenkins
 Too Busy to Work (1932) as Chief of Police
 Pick-Up (1933) as Mr. Brewster
 Destination Unknown (1933) as Turk
 The Three Musketeers (1933) as El Shaitan-Speaking (uncredited)
 Sunset Pass (1933) as Williams
 The Mystic Hour (1933) as Roger Thurston
 Tomorrow at Seven (1933) as Jerry Simons
 Disgraced! (1933) as district attorney
 This Day and Age (1933) as district attorney
 The Road is Open Again (1933, Short) as Abraham Lincoln
 Doctor Bull (1933) as Mr. Upjohn, Selectman (uncredited)
 The Bowery (1933) as Detective (uncredited)
 Big Executive (1933) as Sheriff
 White Woman (1933) as Fenton
 Duck Soup (1933) as Prosecutor
 The World Changes (1933) as Sheriff Wild Bill Hickok (uncredited)
 Lone Cowboy (1933) as U.S. Marshal
 Mr. Skitch (1933) as Frank (uncredited)
 Massacre (1934) as Sheriff Scatters
 Nana (1934) as Man Announcing Start of the War (uncredited)
 David Harum (1934) as Deacon Perkins
 The Last Round-Up (1934) as Sheriff
 Private Scandal (1934) as Mr. Baker (uncredited)
 Murder at the Vanities (1934) as Homer Boothby
 Whom the Gods Destroy (1934) as Constable Malcolm (uncredited)
 When Strangers Meet (1934) as John Tarman
 Mrs. Wiggs of the Cabbage Patch (1934) as Mr. Bagby
 The St. Louis Kid (1934) as Sheriff (uncredited)
 Broadway Bill (1934) as Veterinarian (uncredited)
 Behold My Wife! (1934) as Juan Storm Cloud
 Red Morning (1934) as Stanchon
 The County Chairman (1935) as Riley Cleaver
 Square Shooter (1935) as Jed Miller
 In Spite of Danger (1935) as Mr. Merritt
 The Miracle Rider (1935) as Zaroff
 Reckless (1935) as District Attorney (uncredited)
 Hop-Along Cassidy (1935) as Buck Peters
 Steamboat Round the Bend (1935) as Fleety Belle's Father (uncredited)
 Special Agent (1935) as State Police Commander (uncredited)
 The Virginia Judge (1935)
 Frisco Kid (1935) as Speaker (uncredited)
 Rose of the Rancho (1936) as Horse Doctor (uncredited)
 Sunset of Power (1936) as Neil Brannum
 The Trail of the Lonesome Pine (1936) as Blacksmith
 Road Gang (1936) as Mine Warden Grayson
 Song of the Saddle (1936) as Phineas Hook
 Flash Gordon (1936, Serial) as Ming the Merciless
 Show Boat (1936) as Sheriff Ike Vallon
 A Son Comes Home (1936) as Prosecutor
 Jailbreak (1936) as Dan Stone
 The Texas Rangers (1936) as Higgins' Lawyer (uncredited)
 Ramona (1936) as American Settler (uncredited)
 Wedding Present (1936) as Turnbull (uncredited)
 Career Woman (1936) as Matt Clay
 Empty Saddles (1936) as Cimarron (Cim) White
 The Good Earth (1937) as Banker (uncredited)
 We're on the Jury (1937) as Mr. B.J. Martin, Jury Foreman
 John Meade's Woman (1937) as Farmer (uncredited)
 Two Gun Law (1937) as Wolf Larson
 Hollywood Cowboy (1937) as Doc Kramer
 Yodelin' Kid from Pine Ridge (1937) as Gene Autry Sr.
 Slave Ship (1937) as Slave Dealer
 The Last Train from Madrid (1937) as Warden (uncredited)
 Souls at Sea (1937) as Jury Foreman (uncredited)
 Conquest (1937) as Sergeant at Elba (uncredited)
 Stand-In (1937) as Actor Dressed as Abraham Lincoln (uncredited)
 Jezebel (1938) as Officer (uncredited)
 Flash Gordon's Trip to Mars (1938) as Emperor Ming
 Flaming Frontiers (1938, Serial) as Ace Daggett (Chs. 5-15)
 Dick Tracy Returns (1938) as Pa Stark
 Strange Faces (1938) as Abraham Lincoln look-alike (uncredited)
 The Law West of Tombstone (1938) as Newspaper Editor (uncredited)
 The Strange Case of Dr. Meade (1938) as Lacey
 Kentucky (1938) as Southerner
 Jesse James (1939) as Doctor
 The Oklahoma Kid (1939) as Alec Martin
 Juarez (1939) as Carbajal (scenes deleted)
 Captain Fury (1939) as Mergon
 Daredevils of the Red Circle (1939) as 39013, Harry Crowel
 Wyoming Outlaw (1939) as Luke Parker
 Way Down South (1939) as Cass
 Blackmail (1939) as Southern Deputy (uncredited)
 $1,000 a Touchdown (1939) as Stage Manager (uncredited)
 The Flying Deuces (1939)  as Commandant
 Allegheny Uprising (1939) as Dr. Stoke (uncredited)
 Cowboys from Texas (1939) as Kansas Jones
 Gone with the Wind (1939) as Man With Stove Pipe Hat in Charge of Convict Workers (uncredited)
 Thou Shalt Not Kill (1939) as Lars Olsen
 Abe Lincoln in Illinois (1940) as Tom Lincoln
 The Grapes of Wrath (1940) as Roadblock Leader
 Virginia City (1940) as Jefferson Davis
 Flash Gordon Conquers the Universe (1940, Serial) as Emperor Ming
 Shooting High (1940) as Hod Carson
 Charlie Chan's Murder Cruise (1940) as Mr. Walters
 Island of Doomed Men (1940) as Captain Cort
 Gold Rush Maisie (1940) as Camp Owner with a Pig (uncredited)
 Brigham Young (1940) as Mob Member (uncredited)
 Rangers of Fortune (1940) as Water Thug (uncredited)
 Santa Fe Trail (1940) as Gentry
 Chad Hanna (1940) as Sheriff (scenes deleted)
 Western Union (1941) as Stagecoach Rider (uncredited)
 Ride, Kelly, Ride (1941) as Mr. Dunn, Foreman (uncredited)
 Sergeant York (1941) as Mountaineer (uncredited)
 The Shepherd of the Hills (1941) as Blacksmith (uncredited)
 Wild Geese Calling (1941) as Doctor Jed Sloan
 Belle Starr (1941) as Carpetbagger
 Stick to Your Guns (1941) as Long Ben
 Jungle Man (1941) as Rev. James 'Jim' Graham
 Wild Bill Hickok Rides (1942) as Claim Jumping Leader (uncredited)
 Sing Your Worries Away (1942) as Judge (uncredited)
 The Mystery of Marie Roget (1942) as Curator
 Men of San Quentin (1942) as Saunderson
 Tombstone, the Town Too Tough to Die (1942) as 1st Mayor
 Perils of Nyoka (1942) as Cassib
 Two Weeks to Live (1943) as Elmer Kelton (uncredited)
 Hangmen Also Die! (1943) as Patriot at Meeting with Svoboda (uncredited)
 The Black Raven (1943) as Sheriff
 Batman (1943) as Ken Colton [Ch. 6-8] (uncredited)
 Crazy House (1943) as Sheriff (uncredited)
 The Desert Hawk (1944) as Koda Bey
 Kismet (1944) as The Miser (uncredited)
 Black Arrow (1944) as Tom Whitney
 The Town Went Wild (1944) as Sam, Midvale District Attorney
 Hollywood and Vine (1945) as Wilson, Abigail's Lawyer (uncredited)
 Our Vines Have Tender Grapes (1945) as Kurt Jensen
 Northwest Trail (1945) as Pierre
 Who's Guilty? (1945) as Patton Calvert
 How DOooo You Do (1945) as Sheriff Hayworth
 Strangler of the Swamp (1946) as Ferryman Douglas
 Spook Busters (1946) as Mr. Stiles
 The Killers (1946) as Farmer (uncredited)
 Desert Command (1946) as El Shaitan (voice, uncredited)
 Jack Armstrong (1947) as Jason Grood (uncredited)
 The Sea of Grass (1947) as Charley, Saloon Owner (uncredited)
 Welcome Stranger (1947) as Farmer Pinkett (uncredited)
 Gunfighters (1947) as Sheriff #1 (uncredited)
 Wyoming (1947) as Rev. Withers (uncredited)
 The Pretender (1947) as William the Butler
 Unconquered (1947) as Mulligan (scenes deleted)
 Road to Rio (1947) as Farmer (uncredited)
 My Girl Tisa (1948) as Examiner (uncredited)
 Here Comes Trouble (1948) as Reporter (uncredited)
 Mr. Blandings Builds His Dream House (1948) as Wrecker (uncredited)
 Feudin', Fussin' and A-Fightin' (1948) as Townsman (uncredited)
 Station West (1948) as Sheriff
 Jiggs and Maggie in Court (1948) as Mr. Burton, an Attorney
 The Decision of Christopher Blake (1948) as President in Dream (uncredited)
 The Last Bandit (1949) as Blindfolded Circuit Rider (final film role)

See also

References

External links

 
 
 

1874 births
1949 deaths
American male film actors
American male stage actors
Male film serial actors
Vaudeville performers
Male actors from Kentucky
People from Elizabethtown, Kentucky
Burials at Hollywood Forever Cemetery
20th-century American male actors
Male Western (genre) film actors